This following is a list of films produced, co-produced and/or released by Inti Films.

2010s - Inti Films

Feature films

Creative documentary films

Art films

2000s - Inti Films

Creative documentary films

Short films

Art films

1990s - Inti Films

Feature films

Short films

Creative documentary films

References

External links
 Official Official Inti Films website

Film production companies of Belgium
Inti Films
Inti Films